Tennessee Tears are a Swedish country music duo consisting of Tilda Feuk and Jonas Hermansson. They participated in Melodifestivalen 2023 with the song "Now I Know".

Discography

Singles

References

Melodifestivalen contestants of 2023